Idephrynus scaber is a species of beetle in the family Cerambycidae, the only species in the genus Idephrynus.

References

Acanthocinini